The following is a list of baseball players who have played in the Caribbean Series (Serie del Caribe).

A

 Bobby Abreu
 José Acevedo
 Cy Acosta
 Red Adams
 Bob Alexander
 Juan Agosto
 Luis Aguayo
 Bob Allison
 Héctor Almonte
 Roberto Alomar
 Sandy Alomar Sr.
 Felipe Alou
 Jesús Alou
 Matty Alou
 Porfi Altamirano
 Rogelio Álvarez
 George Altman
 Alfredo Amézaga
 Sandy Amorós
 Larry Anderson
 Rick Anderson
 Joaquín Andújar
 Luis Aparicio
 Luis Aponte
 Tony Armas
 Fernando Arroyo
 Luis Arroyo
 Bob Aspromonte
 Ramón Avilés
 Erick Aybar
 Joe Azcue
 Oscar Azócar

B

 Cory Bailey
 Ed Bailey
 Dan Bankhead
 Steve Barber
 Salomé Barojas
 Nelson Barrera
 Tony Batista
 Earl Battey
 Denny Bautista
 José Bautista (3B)
 José Bautista (P)
 Jim Baxes
 Don Baylor
 Ralph Beard
 Gene Bearden
 Jim Beauchamp
 Julio Bécquer
 Joe Beckwith
 George Bell
 Ronnie Belliard
 Carlos Beltrán
 Héctor Benítez
 Vern Benson
 Yuniesky Betancourt
 Dave Bergman
 Harold Bevan
 Babe Birrer
 Charlie Bishop
 Bud Black (1950s)
 Bud Black (1980s)
 Wayne Blackburn
 Dámaso Blanco
 Gregor Blanco
 Henry Blanco
 Hiram Bocachica
 Bruce Bochy
 Emilio Bonifacio
 Bobby Bonilla
 Pedro Borbón
 Rich Bordi
 Derek Botelho
 Bob Boyd
 José Bracho
 Jackie Brandt
 Ángel Bravo
 Sid Bream
 Tom Brennan
 Chet Brewer
 Tommy Brown
 Willard Brown
 George Brunet
 Derek Bryant
 Ralph Bryant
 Lorenzo Bundy
 Jim Bunning
 Juan Bustabad
 Tommy Byrne

C

 Alex Cabrera
 Daniel Cabrera
 Lorenzo Cabrera
 Melky Cabrera
 Miguel Cabrera
 Joe Caffie
 Iván Calderón
 Alberto Callaspo
 Casey Candaele
 Tom Candiotti
 Robinson Canó
 José Canseco
 José Capellán
 Bernie Carbo
 José Cardenal
 Leo Cárdenas
 Rod Carew
 Giovanni Carrara
 Alex Carrasquel
 Chico Carrasquel
 Amalio Carreño
 Xorge Carrillo
 Rico Carty
 Norm Cash
 Vinny Castilla
 Alberto Castillo
 Braulio Castillo
 Carmen Castillo
 Jesus Castillo
 José Castillo
 Bernie Castro
 Fabio Castro
 César Cedeño
 Ronny Cedeño
 Orlando Cepeda
 Elio Chacón
 Sam Chapman
 Harry Chiti
 Randy Choate
 Alex Cintrón
 Bryan Clark
 Rickey Clark
 Webbo Clarke
 Buster Clarkson
 Reggie Cleveland
 Roberto Clemente
 Willie Collazo
 Terry Collins
 Jesús Colomé
 Bartolo Colón
 Dave Concepción
 Onix Concepción
 Chuck Connors
 José Contreras
 Alex Cora
 Doug Corbett
 Pat Corrales
 Pete Coscarart
 Henry Cotto
 Wes Covington
 Joe Cowley
 Jim Cronin
 George Crowe
 Francisco Cruceta
 Héctor Cruz
 José Cruz
 Nelson Cruz
 Bobby Cuellar
 Mike Cuellar

D

 Pompeyo Davalillo
 Víctor Davalillo
 Chili Davis
 Glenn Davis
 Tommy Davis
 Willie Davis
 Valerio de los Santos
 Cot Deal
 Joe Decker
 Alex Delgado
 Carlos Delgado
 Luis de León
 Elmer Dessens
 Baudilio (Bo) Díaz
 Joselo Díaz
 Víctor Díaz
 Miguel Diloné
 Tom Dixon
 Dan Dobbek
 Pat Dodson
 Solly Drake
 Art Ditmar
 Erubiel Durazo
 Leon Durham
 Jerry Dybzinski

E

 Luke Easter
 Robert Ellis
 Don Elston
 Edwin Encarnación
 Nino Escalera
 Héctor Espino
 Francisco Estrada

F

 Bob Fallon
 Carmen Fanzone
 Turk Farrell
 Pedro Feliciano
 Félix Fermín
 Chico Fernández
 Tony Fernández
 Wilmer Fields
 Luis Figueroa
 Nelson Figueroa
 Tommy Fine
 Dalmiro Finol
 Andrés Fleitas
 Pedro Formental
 Mike Fornieles
 Ray Fosse
 Art Fowler
 Alan Fowlkes
 Howie Fox
 Tito Francona
 Owen Friend

G

 Andrés Galarraga
 Dámaso García
 Dave Garcia
 Karim García
 Ron Gardenhire
 Jim Gentile
 César Gerónimo
 Gerónimo Gil
 Gustavo Gil
 Jim Gilliam
 Al Gionfriddo
 Dan Gladden
 Alexis Gómez
 Rubén Gómez
 Álex González
 Édgar González
 Geremi González
 Juan González
 René González
 Tony González
 Rubén Gotay
 Milt Graff
 David Green
 Pumpsie Green
 David Grier
 Ken Griffey Sr.
 Alfredo Griffin
 Mike Guerra
 Pedro Guerrero
 Vladimir Guerrero
 Ozzie Guillén
 Larry Gura
 Franklin Gutiérrez
 José Guzmán
 Freddy Guzmán
 Jesús Guzmán

H

 Bert Haas
 Luther Hackman
 Kevin Hagen
 Jerry Hairston Sr.
 Garvin Hamner
 Chuck Harmon
 Bill Harris
 Mickey Hatcher
 Joe Hatten
 Gorman Heimueller
 Rickey Henderson
 Elrod Hendricks
 Gail Henley
 Ubaldo Heredia
 Jesús Hernáiz
 Anderson Hernández
 Carlos Hernández
 Enzo Hernández
 Jackie Hernández
 Leonardo Hernández
 Ramón Hernández
 Roberto Hernández
 Willie Hernández
 José Herrera
 Johnny Hetki
 Buddy Hicks
 Bobo Holloman
 Bob Hooper
 Burt Hooton
 Mike Howard
 Trenidad Hubbard
 Tom Hughes
 Mark Huismann
 Ken Hunt
 Clint Hurdle

I
 Monte Irvin

J

 Reggie Jackson
 Ron Jackson
 Spook Jacobs
 Dion James
 Larry Jaster
 Stan Javier
 Sam Jethroe
 Elvio Jiménez
 Houston Jiménez
 Howard Johnson
 Chris Jones
—Gary Jones - Ponce 1972  (2 wins 0 losses)
 Odell Jones
 Sam Jones
 Sad Sam Jones
 Spider Jorgensen

K

 Jeff Kaiser
 Mike Kekich
 Pat Kelly
 Thornton Kipper
 Bill Kirk
 Lou Klein

L

 Clem Labine
 Rafael Landestoy
 Tony Larussa
 Tommy Lasorda
 George Lauzerique
 Rudy Law
 Tom Lawless
 Brooks Lawrence
 Luis Leal
 Craig Lefferts
 Ron LeFlore
 Justin Lehr
 Dave Leonhard
 Maximino León
 Dennis Lewallyn
 Jim Lewis
 José Lima
 Lou Limmer
 Francisco Lindor
 Felipe Lira
 Jack Lohrke
 Aurelio López
 Héctor López
 Javy López
 Rodrigo López
 Urbano Lugo
 Jerry Lynch

M

 Héctor Maestri
 Candy Maldonado
 Carlos Maldonado
 Fred Manrique
 Félix Mantilla
 Jerry Manuel
 Ravelo Manzanillo
 Robert Marcano
 Joe Margoneri
 Juan Marichal
 Carlos Mármol
 Gonzalo Márquez
 Canena Márquez
 Connie Marrero
 Buck Martinez
 Café Martínez
 Carmelo Martínez
 Edgar Martínez
 Pedro Martínez
 Sandy Martínez
 Teodoro Martínez
 Luis Matos
 Agapito Mayor
 Willie Mays
 Luis Maza
 Lloyd McClendon
 Mark McGwire
 Román Mejías
 Jackson Melián
 Mario Mendoza
 Orlando Mercado
 Jim Merritt
 Ed Mierkowicz
 Eddie Miller
 Minnie Miñoso
 Bengie Molina
 José Molina
 Yadier Molina
 Sid Monge
 Aurelio Monteagudo
 René Monteagudo
 Ray Monzant
 Wally Moon
 Junior Moore
 Melvin Mora
 José Morales
 Seth Morehead
 Orber Moreno
 Roger Moret
 Guillermo Moscoso
 Les Moss
 Manny Mota
 Billy Muffett
 Agustín Murillo
 Bob Muncrief
 Dwayne Murphy
 Ronnier Mustelier

N

 Cholly Naranjo
 Julio Navarro
 Charlie Neal
 Rocky Nelson
 Randy Niemann
 Donell Nixon
 Ray Noble
 Edwin Núñez
 Vladimir Núñez

O

 Francisco Oliveras
 José Oquendo
 David Ortiz
 Roberto Ortiz
 Eric Owens
 Jim Owens
 Pablo Ozuna

P

 José Pagán
 Satchel Paige
 Rafael Palmeiro
 Johnny Paredes
 Camilo Pascual
 Carlos Pascual
 Carlos Paula
 Les Peden
 Al Pedrique
 Jailen Peguero
 Alejandro Peña
 Carlos Peña
 José Peña
 Orlando Peña
 Tony Peña
 Tony Peña Jr.
 Carlos Pérez
 Óliver Pérez
 Pascual Pérez
 Tony Pérez
 Timo Pérez
 Alonzo Perry
 Gregorio Petit
 Ken Phelps
 Mike Piazza
 Lou Piniella
 Juan Pizarro
 Herb Plews
 Gus Polidor
 Vic Power
 Luis Pujols
 Alfonso Pulido

Q
 Luis Quiñones

R

 Hanley Ramírez
 Manny Ramírez
 Bobby Ramos
 Chucho Ramos
 Pedro Ramos
 Wilson Ramos
 Jim Ray
 Floyd Rayford
 Gilberto Reyes
 José Reyes
 René Reyes
 José Rijo
 Alex Ríos
 Armando Ríos

 Jay Ritchie
 Jim Rivera
 Rubén Rivera
 Curt Roberts
 Frank Robinson
 Óscar Robles
 Rafael Robles
 Sergio Robles
 Alex Rodríguez
 Francisco Rodríguez
 Héctor Rodríguez

 Iván Rodríguez

 Luis Rodríguez-Olmo
 Cookie Rojas
 Vicente Romo
 Luis Rosado
 John Roseboro
 Ken Rowe
 Jean-Pierre Roy
 Michael Ryan

S

 Argenis Salazar
 Luis Salazar
 Oscar Salazar
 Luis Sánchez
 Orlando Sánchez
 Jack Sanford
 Rafael Santana
 Benito Santiago
 José 'Pantalones' Santiago
 Manny Sarmiento
 Steve Sax
 Pat Scantlebury
 Hank Schenz
 Mike Schmidt
 Mike Scioscia
 Marco Scutaro
 Jeff Sellers
 Wilmer Shantz
 Bob Shaw
 Don Shaw
 Razor Shines
 Candy Sierra
 Rubén Sierra
 Randall Simon
 Wayne Simpson
 Bob Skinner
 Dave Smith
 Hal Smith
 Jerry Snyder
 Julio Solano
 Alay Soler
 Sammy Sosa
 Mario Soto
 Cliff Speck
 Daryl Spencer
 Ed Spiezio
 Mike Stanton
 Dick Starr
 Jeff Stone
 Dave Stewart
 Mike Sweeney
 José St. Claire

T

 Dwight Taylor
 Tony Taylor
 Miguel Tejada
 Johnny Temple
 Derrel Thomas
 Valmy Thomas
 Dickie Thon
 Bob Thurman
 Kevin Tolar
 Wayne Tolleson
 Pablo Torrealba
 Félix Torres
 Salomón Torres
 César Tovar
 Jim Tracy
 Ralph Treuel
 Alex Treviño
 Gus Triandos
 Manny Trillo
 Quincy Trouppe
 Joe Tuminelli

U

 Jim Umbricht
 José Uribe

V

 José Valentín
 Fernando Valenzuela
 Sebastián Valle
 Javier Vázquez
 Jesús Vega
 Guillermo Vento
 Zoilo Versalles
 Omar Vizquel

W

 Stan Wall
 Lee Walls
 Bill Werle
 Jerry White
 Hoyt Wilhelm
 Bernie Williams
 Bump Wills
 Archie Wilson
 Bob Wilson
 Earl Wilson
 George Wilson
 Casey Wise
 Pete Wojey
 Clyde Wright
 Ed Wright

Y

 Lenny Yochim
 Matt Young

Z

 Adrián Zabala
 Chris Zachary
 Mauro Zárate
 Don Zimmer

Sources
Antero Núñez, José. Series del Caribe. Impresos Urbina, Caracas, Venezuela.
Araujo Bojórquez, Alfonso. Series del Caribe: Narraciones y estadísticas, 1949-2001. Colegio de Bachilleres del Estado de Sinaloa, Mexico.
Figueredo, Jorge S. Cuban Baseball: A Statistical History, 1878 - 1961. Macfarland & Co., United States.
González Echevarría, Roberto. The Pride of Havana. Oxford University Express.
Gutiérrez, Daniel. Enciclopedia del Béisbol en Venezuela, Caracas, Venezuela.

External links
Official site
Latino Baseball
Series del Caribe, Las (Spanish)

Caribbean